The 2005–06 Guinness Premiership was the 19th season of the top flight of the English domestic rugby union competitions, played between September 2005 and May 2006. The final was contested by the Sale Sharks and the Leicester Tigers at Twickenham. Sale Sharks won 45–20 to win the Premiership. Leeds Tykes were relegated, whilst Harlequins were promoted for the 2006-07 Guinness Premiership.

As per a tradition started in the previous year, two of the opening games of the season (round 1) were played at Twickenham, in the 2005 London Double Header.

Participating teams 

Notes

Table

Results

Round 1

Round 2

Round 3

Round 4

Round 5

Round 6

Round 7

Round 8

Round 9

Round 10

Round 11

Round 12

Round 13

Round 14

Round 15

Round 16

Round 17

Round 18

Round 19

Round 20

Rearranged fixture

Round 21

Round 22

Play-offs

Semi-finals

Final

Sky Sports Dream Team 2005/06
15 Matt Burke (Newcastle Falcons)
14 Tom Varndell (Leicester Tigers)
13 Mathew Tait (Newcastle Falcons)
12 Mike Catt (London Irish)
11 Tom Voyce (London Wasps)
10 Carlos Spencer (Northampton Saints)
9 Justin Marshall (Leeds Tykes)
1 Tony Windo (Worcester Warriors)
2 Mark Regan (Bristol)
3 Cobus Visagie (Saracens)
4 Danny Grewcock (Bath Rugby)
5 Ben Kay (Leicester Tigers)
6 Matt Salter (captain, Bristol)
7 Magnus Lund (Sale Sharks)
8 Juan Manuel Leguizamón (London Irish)

Total Season Attendances

Top scorers
Note: Flags to the left of player names indicate national team as has been defined under World Rugby eligibility rules, or primary nationality for players who did not earn international senior caps. Players may hold one or more non-WR nationalities.

Most points
Source:

Most tries
Source:

References

External links
 Official site

 
2005-06
 
England